The Wicked Flee is a 1940 mystery crime novel by the British writer Anne Hocking. It was the second novel in a long-running series featuring her detective character Chief Inspector William Austen of Scotland Yard.

Adaptation
In 1957 it was adapted into the British film The Surgeon's Knife directed by Gordon Parry and starring Donald Houston, Adrienne Corri and Lyndon Brook.

References

Bibliography
 Goble, Alan. The Complete Index to Literary Sources in Film. Walter de Gruyter, 1999.
 Hubin, Allen J. 1981-1985 Supplement to Crime Fiction, 1749-1980. Garland Pub., 1988.
 Reilly, John M. Twentieth Century Crime & Mystery Writers. Springer, 2015.

1940 British novels
British mystery novels
British thriller novels
British crime novels
Novels by Anne Hocking
British detective novels
British novels adapted into films
Geoffrey Bles books